Hume's short-toed lark (Calandrella acutirostris) is a species of lark in the family Alaudidae. It is found in south-central Asia from Iran and Kazakhstan to China.

Taxonomy and systematics
The name commemorates the British naturalist Allan Octavian Hume who described the species. The alternate name short-toed lark may also be used for three other species in the genus Calandrella. The alternate name lesser short-toed lark should not be confused with the species of the same name, Alaudala rufescens. Other alternate names for Hume's short-toed lark include Hume's lark and Karakoram short-toed lark.

Subspecies 
Two subspecies are recognized: 
 C. a. acutirostris - Hume, 1873: Found from north-eastern Iran and eastern Kazakhstan to western China 
 Tibet short-toed lark (C. a. tibetana) - Brooks, WE, 1880: Originally described as a separate species. Found from north-eastern Pakistan to Tibetan Plateau

Description
Hume's short-toed lark is similar in size and appearance to the greater short-toed lark but is generally a duller-looking bird with slightly darker plumage and a slightly smaller beak. As with the greater short-toed lark, the colour varies across the broad range and is not a good distinguishing feature. The crown is brown with slight diffuse streaking, the cheeks are rufous-brown and the supercilium white. The upper parts are greyish-brown or sandy brown with darker streaking, and the upper tail coverts are washed with rufous-brown. The wings are greyish-brown with black barring and pale tips to the feathers. The underparts are mostly whitish, but there is a dark neck patch and a buffish-grey breast band. The breast is unstreaked. The voice helps distinguish this species; vocalisations include a shrill "trree" and a more rolling "drreep".

Gallery

References

External links

 
 
 
 
 
 

Hume's short-toed lark
Birds of Afghanistan
Birds of Central Asia
Birds of Pakistan
Birds of the Himalayas
Birds of Tibet
Birds of Western China
Hume's short-toed lark
Taxonomy articles created by Polbot